The TUM School of Computation, Information and Technology (CIT) is a school of the Technical University of Munich, established in 2022 by the merger of three former departments. As of 2022, it is structured into the Department of Mathematics, the Department of Computer Engineering, the Department of Computer Science, and the Department of Electrical Engineering.

Department of Mathematics 
The Department of Mathematics (MATH) is located at the Garching campus.

History 
Mathematics was taught from the beginning at the Polytechnische Schule in München and the later Technische Hochschule München. Otto Hesse was the department's first professor for calculus, analytical geometry and analytical mechanics. Over the years, several institutes for mathematics were formed.

In 1974, the Institute of Geometry was merged with the Institute of Mathematics to form the Department of Mathematics, and informatics, which had been part of the Institute of Mathematics, became a separate department.

Research Groups 
As of 2022, the research groups at the department are:
 Algebra
 Analysis
 Analysis and Modelling
 Applied Numerical Analysis, Optimization and Data Analysis
 Biostatistics
 Discrete Optimization
 Dynamic Systems
 Geometry and Topology
 Mathematical Finance
 Mathematical Optimization
 Mathematical Physics
 Mathematical Modeling of Biological Systems
 Numerical Mathematics
 Numerical Methods for Plasma Physics
 Optimal Control
 Probability Theory
 Scientific Computing
 Statistics

Department of Computer Science 
The Department of Computer Science (CS) is located at the Garching campus.

History 
The first courses in computer science at the Technical University of Munich were offered in 1967 at the Department of Mathematics, when Friedrich L. Bauer introduced a two-semester lecture titled Information Processing. In 1968, Klaus Samelson started offering a second lecture cycle titled Introduction to Informatics. By 1992, the computer science department had separated from the Department of Mathematics to form an independent Department of Informatics.

In 2002, the department relocated from its old campus in the Munich city center to the new building on the Garching campus.

In 2017, the Department celebrated 50 Years of Informatics Munich with a series of lectures and ceremonies, together with the Ludwig Maximilian University of Munich and the Bundeswehr University Munich.

Chairs 
As of 2022, the department consists of the following chairs:
 AI in Healthcare and Medicine
 Algorithmic Game Theory
 Algorithms and Complexity
 Application and Middleware Systems
 Augmented Reality
 Bioinformatics
 Computational Imaging and AI in Medicine
 Computational Molecular Medicine
 Computer Aided Medical Procedures
 Computer Graphics and Visualization
 Computer Vision and AI
 Cyber Trust
 Data Analytics and Machine Learning
 Data Science and Engineering
 Database Systems
 Decision Science & Systems
 Dynamic Vision and Learning
 Efficient Algorithms
 Engineering Software for Decentralized Systems
 Ethics in Systems Design and Machine Learning
 Formal Languages, Compiler & Software Construction
 Formal Methods for Software Reliability
 Hardware-aware Algorithms and Software for HPC
 Information Systems & Business Process Management
 Law and Security of Digitization
 Legal Tech
 Logic and Verification
 Machine Learning of 3D Scene Geometry
 Physics-based Simulation
 Quantum Computing
 Scientific Computing
 Software & Systems Engineering
 Software Engineering
 Software Engineering for Business Information Systems
 Theoretical Computer Science
 Theoretical Foundations of AI
 Visual Computing

Notable people 
Seven faculty members of the Department of Informatics have been awarded the Gottfried Wilhelm Leibniz Prize, one of the highest endowed research prizes in Germany with a maximum of €2.5 million per award:
 2020 – Thomas Neumann
 2016 – Daniel Cremers
 2008 – Susanne Albers
 1997 – Ernst Mayr
 1995 – Gerd Hirzinger
 1994 – Manfred Broy
 1991 – 

Friedrich L. Bauer was awarded the 1988 IEEE Computer Society Computer Pioneer Award for inventing the stack data structure. Gerd Hirzinger was awarded the 2005 IEEE Robotics and Automation Society Pioneer Award.  and Burkhard Rost were awarded the Alexander von Humboldt Professorship in 2011 and 2008, respectively. Rudolf Bayer was known for inventing the B-tree and Red–black tree.

Department of Electrical Engineering 
The Department of Electrical Engineering (EE) is located at the Munich campus.

History 

The first lectures in the field of electricity at the Polytechnische Schule München were given as early as 1876 by the physicist Wilhelm von Bezold. Over the years, as the field of electrical engineering became increasingly important, a separate department for electrical engineering emerged within the mechanical engineering department. In 1967, the department was renamed the Faculty of Mechanical and Electrical Engineering, and six electrical engineering departments were permanently established.

In April 1974, the formal establishment of the new TUM Department of Electrical and Computer Engineering took place. While still located in the Munich campus, a new building is currently in construction on the Garching campus and the department is expected to move by 2025.

Professorships 
As of 2022, the department consists of the following chairs and professorships:
 Biomedical Electronics
 Circuit Design
 Computational Photonics
 Control and Manipulation of Microscale Living Objects
 Environmental Sensing and Modeling
 High Frequency Engineering
 Hybrid Electronic Systems
 Measurement Systems and Sensor Technology
 Micro- and Nanosystems Technology
 Microwave Engineering
 Molecular Electronics
 Nano and Microrobotics
 Nano and Quantum Sensors
 Neuroelectronics
 Physics of Electrotechnology
 Quantum Electronics and Computer Engineering
 Semiconductor Technology
 Simulation of Nanosystems for Energy Conversion

Department of Computer Engineering 
The Department of Computer Engineering was separated from the former Department of Electrical and Computer Engineering as the result of merger into the School of Computation, Information and Technology.

Professorships 
As of 2022, the department consists of the following chairs and professorships:
 Architecture of Parallel and Distributed Systems
 Audio Information Processing
 Automatic Control Engineering
 Bio-inspired Information Processing
 Coding and Cryptography
 Communications Engineering
 Communication Networks
 Computer Architecture & Operating Systems
 Computer Architecture and Parallel Systems
 Connected Mobility
 Cognitive Systems
 Cyber Physical Systems
 Data Processing
 Electronic Design Automation
 Embedded Systems and Internet of Things
 Healthcare and Rehabilitation Robotics
 Human-Machine Communication
 Information-oriented Control
 Integrated Systems
 Line Transmission Technology
 Machine Learning for Robotics
 Machine Learning in Engineering
 Machine Vision and Perception
 Media Technology
 Network Architectures and Services
 Neuroengineering Materials
 Real-Time Computer Systems
 Robotics Science and System Intelligence 
 Robotics, AI and realtime systems
 Security in Information Technology
 Sensor-based Robot Systems and Intelligent Assistance Systems
 Signal Processing Methods
 Theoretical Information Technology

Building 

The Department of Computer Science shares a building with the Department of Mathematics.

In the building, two massive parabolic slides run from the fourth floor to the ground floor. Their shape corresponds to the equation  and is supposed to represent the "connection of science and art".

Rankings 

The Department of Computer Science has been consistently rated the top computer science department in Germany by major rankings. Globally, it is rated No. 29 (QS), No. 10 (THE), and within No. 51-75 (ARWU). In the 2020 national CHE University Ranking, the department is among the top rated departments for computer science and business informatics, being rated in the top group for the majority of criteria.

The Department of Mathematics has been rated as one of the top mathematics departments in Germany: in the QS World University Rankings, it ranks 51st in the world and second nationally, while it is ranked between 51 and 75 in the Academic Ranking of World Universities. In Statistics & Operational Research, QS ranks TUM first in Germany and 32nd in the world.

The Departments of Electrical and Computer Engineering are leading in Germany. In Electrical & Electronic Engineering, TUM is rated 18th worldwide by QS and 19th by ARWU. The Times Higher Education World University Rankings does not rank individual subjects, though in engineering in general, TUM is ranked 20th globally and 1st nationally.

See also 
 Summer School Marktoberdorf

References

External links 
 

 
2022 establishments in Germany
Educational institutions established in 2022
Computer science departments
Electrical and computer engineering departments
Schools of mathematics